Louis Meredith Dyke (1888 – 12 July 1961) was a Welsh rugby union player who won four international caps at centre for Wales between 1910 and 1911. At club level he played for several clubs, most notably Cardiff and London Welsh.

References

1888 births
1961 deaths
Rugby union players from Cardiff
Welsh rugby union players
Wales international rugby union players
Rugby union centres
Penarth RFC players
London Welsh RFC players
Barbarian F.C. players
Cardiff RFC players
People educated at Christ College, Brecon